Aurantiacibacter gangjinensis  is a Gram-negative and aerobic bacteria from the genus Aurantiacibacter which has been isolated from seawater from Gangjin Bay in Korea.

References

Further reading

External links
Type strain of Erythrobacter gangjinensis at BacDive -  the Bacterial Diversity Metadatabase

Sphingomonadales
Bacteria described in 2010